Vällingby is a suburban district in Västerort in the western part of Stockholm Municipality, Sweden.

History 
The agricultural land where the modern suburb now stands, has a history stretching some 2,000 years back (i.e. at least twice as old as Stockholm).  The people who lived there were known as vaellingar, "those living on the embankment".  While it first appears in historical records in 1347 and it is known that two farmyards existed here during the reign of King Gustav Vasa in the 16th century, in the 1922 edition of Nordisk Familjebok the location was still regarded as too insignificant to deserve an article.  In 1953 the number of inhabitants barely exceeded 2,000.

As part of a wider plan to decentralise the population of Stockholm, this rural land was quickly transformed into the present modern suburb, inaugurated in 1954 in a ceremony attracting some 75,000 people.  Vällingby was the first ABC City (ABC-stad) — an acronym for Arbete – Bostad – Centrum, "Labour – Housing – Centre"—a suburb that acted almost like a city, designed to offer its residents everything they needed.  High above the modern structure, a rotating V-symbol placed the project on the map, while the shining T-symbol (for tunnelbana, metro) proudly indicated the presence of the newly built Stockholm Metro.  Shortly after the inauguration of the modern suburb, the number of inhabitants had reached 25,000.

The new suburb was the fruit of plans to exploit the rural areas surrounding Stockholm dating back to the early 20th century.  As a direct consequence of real-estate speculations around the turn of the 20th century, centralised municipal city planning was widely accepted as a necessary tool to solve the acute housing shortage and the City of Stockholm bought large areas for the purpose.  During the decades preceding the construction of Vällingby, a series of small-scale suburbs had been realised; some more or less exclusive—such as the egnahemsområden ("own-your-own-home areas") at Stocksund and Saltsjöbaden built around 1900; or in the style of the Garden city movement, like in Bromma and Enskede built between the wars; and low blocks of apartments built during the 1940s, like in Traneberg and Abrahamsberg. However, many of these suburbs had turned into dormitory suburbs, a problem thought to be avoided in Vällingby by planning for approximately 10,000 work places for the 20–25,000 inhabitants, while the metro was to provide commercial centre access for some 80,000 people.

The planning and architecture of Vällingby was influenced by ideas from North America-notably Clarence Stein's 'Radburn Idea'-and the New Towns in the United Kingdom. In turn, Vällingby become a much discussed and influential model of suburban development in different parts of the world.

The original plan for the area was designed by architect Sven Markelius (1889–1972) city planning director in Stockholm, who placed high-rise buildings near the metro stations with peripheral self-contained houses and green areas around it.  While the Social Democrats are widely acknowledged for the realisation of Vällingby, other political parties and, not the least, private entrepreneurs actively took part in the planning process.  In 1955, the master plan drawn up by Sven Markelius for Farsta in Söderort was also adopted.

However, the ABC City failed to work as intended as most people found work elsewhere. Nevertheless, Vällingby remains one of the most popular suburbs of Stockholm with a cultural significance unsurpassed by later suburbs built as part of the so-called Million Programme during the 1960s and 1970s, such as Skärholmen and Tensta, where less efforts were spent on cultural and  social infrastructure.

Renovation
Beginning in the late 1980s, a plan to renovate the main centre of Vällingby was discussed. In 2001, a plan was accepted by the local political powers. The major redevelopment of the centre was finished and inaugurated officially in April 2008.

Notable natives 
Olof Palme - Prime Minister of Sweden 1969 to 1976 and 1982 to 1986.
Toomas Hendrik Ilves - President of Estonia 2006 to 2016.
John Ausonius - the Laser Man killer.
Benny Andersson - composer, pianist and ABBA-member.
Darin (singer).
Kenta (musician).
Quorthon - musician of the extreme metal band Bathory (band)
Bill Skarsgård - actor born August 9, 1990.
Alexander Skarsgård - actor from HBO TV series True Blood and Big Little Lies.
Dejan Kulusevski - Juventus football player.

See also
Hässelby-Vällingby
Vinstagårdsskolan

Notes

Other sources
David Pass (1969) Vällingby and Farsta--from idea to reality: The suburban development process in a large Swedish city (Statens institut for byggnadsförskning)

External links

The Urban Order of the North a 1972 analysis of the city by Leonard Downie Jr funded by the Alicia Patterson Foundation
Vällingby: a post-war model of suburbia and its international admirers – Research on the planning of Vällingby and its influences.

Districts in Västerort
Metropolitan Stockholm
Urban planning in Sweden